Tony Park is an international author of thriller and non-fiction books. Park has worked as a newspaper reporter, public relations consultant, freelance writer, and as a government press secretary, in addition to writing numerous novels and non-fiction books. He also served in the Australian Army Reserve for 34 years, including a 6-month tour in Afghanistan in 2002 as a public affairs officer.

Life and career 
Park was born in 1964 in Taupo New Zealand, he moved to Sydney, Australia at the age of three and grew up in Campbelltown in South Western Sydney. Park attended Campbelltown Public School and Campbelltown East Public School.  Park also attended St Gregory’s College, Campbelltown, and was awarded dux in 1981. Park also did a journalism cadetship at The Glebe and Western Weekly newspaper in Glebe from 1984 to 1987. He worked as a journalist at the St George and Sutherland Shire Leader in 1987-88. He worked as a press secretary for NSW Premier Nick Greiner from 1988 to 1991.  He worked as press secretary for the NSW Minister for Justice and Police from 1991 to 1993. Park also worked as a journalist for the Bucks Herald and Bucks Advertiser newspapers in Buckinghamshire, UK, from 1993 to 1994. Park was a PR consultant for International Public Relations, Crows Nest, Sydney, from 1994 to 1996.

Park quit his job in 1996 and  gave up his career as a journalist to follow his dream of being a full-time writer. His first novel, set in the outback during WWII , failed to get published. Had a second attempt at writing a novel while travelling in Africa in 1998, and this one was accepted by Pan Macmillan Australia, and published in 2004 as Far Horizon. He and his wife spend half of every year living in a private nature reserve near the Kruger National Park in South Africa. Park is an avid supporter of several charities concerned with wildlife and people in Africa, he is a patron of Painted Dog Conservation, a charity that is dedicated to protecting the painted dog in Africa.

Military service 
Tony Park served in the Australian Army Reserves in a variety of roles.

1982-1984 served as a rifleman, Sydney University Regiment, Royal Australian Infantry

1984-1996 - served as an Air Dispatcher and Air Dispatch Crew Commander corporal  with 177 Air Dispatch Squadron, Royal Australian Corps of Transport

1996 - 2016 - served as a Captain in the Australian Army Public Relations Service, including brief deployments to Papua New Guinea and Easter Timor.  In 2002 served as the Public Affairs Officer for the Australian Special Operations Task Group in Afghanistan from July–December 2002.

Novels 
Tony Park is the author of 19 novels set in Africa and six non fiction biographies. Park combines his background as a major in the Australia Army Reserve and his love of Africa to write his novels.

Fiction 

 Far Horizon, Pan Macmillan 2004
 Zambezi, Pan Macmillan 2005
 African Sky, Pan Macmillan 2006
 Safari, Pan Macmillan 2007
 Silent Predator, Pan Macmillan 2008
 Ivory Pan Macmillan 2009
 The Delta, Pan Macmillan 2010
 African Dawn, Pan Macmillan 2011
 Dark Heart, Pan Macmillan 2012
 The Prey, Pan Macmillan 2013
 The Hunter, Pan Macmillan] 2014
 An Empty Coast, Pan Macmillan 2015
 Red Earth, Pan Macmillan 2016
 The Cull, Pan Macmillan 2017
 Captive, Pan Macmillan  2018
 Scent of Fear, Pan Macmillan, 2018 
 Ghosts of the Past, Pan Macmillan, 2019
 Last Survivor, Pan Macmillan, 2020
 Blood Trail, Pan Macmillan, 2021

Non fiction 
 Part of the Pride: My Life Among the Big Cats of Africa, with Kevin Richardson, 2009
 War Dogs, with Shane Bryant, 2010 (re-released 2010)
 The Grey Man, with John Curtis, 2011
 Bush Vet, with Dr Clay Wilson, 2013
 Courage Under Fire, with Daniel Keighran, VC, 2020
 No One Left Behind, with Keith Payne, VC, 2021

Linked Books 

 The ‘Sonja Kurtz Series’  - Tough former female mercenary Sonja Kurtz has proved to be one of Park's most popular characters with his audiences. The ‘Sonja’ books in order are as follows: The Delta, An Empty Coast, The Cull
 Zimbabwean saga, -  'African Sky’ and ‘African Dawn’, ‘African Sky’ takes place in 1943, during the Second World War, and ‘African Dawn’ picks up the story of the Bryant, Ngwenya and Quilter-Phipps families from 1959 to the present.
 Detective Sannie van Rensburg - A recurring character in some of Parks books is the intrepid, brave and clever Captain Sannie (Susan) van Rensburg. Sannie first appears in ‘Silent Predator’ as the leading lady, and reappears later as an investigating officer (in minor roles) in some other books. The order in which she appears: 'Silent Predator', 'Dark Heart', 'The Hunter', 'Red Earth', 'The Cull', Captive'
 Jed Banks - Jed Banks is a US special forces soldier and CIA agent. Jed debuts as the leading man in Zambezi, but he’s been known to emerge from the shadows in a few other stories. Here’s the order in which Jed comes appears; 'Zambezi', 'Red Earth', 'Scent of Fear'
 Shane Castle - First appearing in a starring role in ‘Safari’, Shane is a Zimbabwean-born ex Australian SAS soldier, who returns to his African homeland to join the war on poaching. Shane appears a second time in ‘Red Earth’ as a hired gun.

Influences 
Park has said that his favourite author of fiction set in Africa is John Gordon Davis, whose first novel, Hold My Hand I'm Dying, set in Rhodesia (now Zimbabwe) was an international bestseller. Park also wrote the foreword to ‘Hold My Hand’, a biography of Gordon Davis, by David Hilton- Barber.

References

External links 

 Authors Website
 Pan Macmillan Australia 
 Facebook Page 
 Painted Dog Conservation

Living people
Australian writers
Year of birth missing (living people)